Gurbuki (Dargwa: ГъурбукIи) is a rural locality (a selo) in Karabudakhkentsky District, Republic of Dagestan, Russia. The population was 5,322 as of 2010. There are 56 streets.

Geography 
Gurbuki is located 14 km south of Karabudakhkent (the district's administrative centre) by road. Gubden and Karabudakhkent are the nearest rural localities.

Nationalities 
Dargins live there.

References 

Rural localities in Karabudakhkentsky District